Neocollyris prominens is a species of ground beetle in the genus Neocollyris in the family Carabidae. It was described by Naviaux in 1991.

References

Prominens, Neocollyris
Beetles described in 1991